Mark Povinelli (born August 9, 1971) is an American stage, television and movie actor who also does occasional stunt work. Povinelli is also a noted social activist advocating for the rights of others with dwarfism. In June 2017 Povinelli was elected President of the Little People of America, an organization started in 1957 by Billy Barty, which promotes awareness, advocacy and medical assistance for individuals with forms of dwarfism. Povinelli stands 3’ 9½" and weighs 75 pounds (115 cm, 34 kg) as a consequence of spondyloepiphyseal dysplasia congenita (SEDc), a skeletal dysplasia caused by a mutation in the COL2A1 (type II collagen) gene.

Life and career
Povinelli was born in Elyria, Ohio, and is the youngest of four children. His parents and siblings are average-size. His older brother Brian Povinelli is a marketer who inspired Mark's acting career. He is of Italian descent. Povinelli graduated from Our Lady of Good Counsel High School in Wheaton, Maryland in 1989, and then graduated in 1993 from Miami University with a degree in Mass Communications and a minor in Theater Acting.  His repertory encompasses drama, comedy, and fantasy. He has appeared in a wide range of productions, from stage plays by William Shakespeare and Ben Jonson to roles in television series such as Modern Family and Boardwalk Empire, as well as in popular movies including The Polar Express (2004, directed by Robert Zemeckis). Onstage in 2003 in Lee Breuer's production of Henrik Ibsen's A Doll's House, retitled Mabou Mines DollHouse, Povinelli drew praise from The New York Times: "The men embody small-minded convention and stunted possibilities...Mr. Povinelli makes us feel Torvald's repressive sexual virility at every turn." He has characterized his approach to acting for The Village Voice: "Being so tremendously different provides you with an analytical depth ... Like any actor, I try to bring as much of myself to the role I'm playing as possible. Every day I go out I'm made aware of my size. Why should I deny myself the richness of that experience when I go onstage?"

Povinelli starred opposite Robert Pattinson and Oscar winners Reese Witherspoon and Christoph Waltz in the Fox 2011 film, Water for Elephants, playing the role of Kinko. The film was adapted from the NY Times bestseller by Sara Gruen and premiered April 2011.

He appeared in Mirror Mirror (2012), which starred Julia Roberts, Armie Hammer (The Social Network), and Lily Collins. In the same year, Povinelli was cast as a series regular on the television series Are You There, Chelsea?, starring Laura Prepon. This made him the first little person ever to be cast as a series regular on a network studio sitcom.

In 2015-2016 he had a recurring role as "The Cat" in the Amazon Studios original Mad Dogs, which also starred Steve Zahn and Michael Imperioli.

Since 2014 Mark can be heard weekly on LA Talk Radio's "Perfectly Imperfect Radio" program.

Personal life 
Povinelli currently resides in Los Angeles with his wife, Heather Davis, and their two children. Mark's brother-in-law, Erik Davis, was the 2020 El Presidente of Old Spanish Days Fiesta and is a television executive. Erik lives with his wife Angelique and their dog Joy, just north of Montecito, CA.

Filmography 
Films:
 2021: Nightmare Alley - The Major
 2013: Pawn Shop Chronicles - Harry 
 2012: The Hot Flashes - Coach Paul Lazarini
 2012: Mirror Mirror - Half Pint 
 2011: Water for Elephants - Kinko / Walter
 2008 Beer for My Horses - Merriweather
 2007: Epic Movie - Oompa Loompa

Television:
 2018: My Dinner with Hervé - Billy Barty
 2016: Sigmund and the Sea Monsters - Sigmund 
 2016: Still the King - Santonio Trillions
 2015: Mad Dogs - The Cat
 2015: Dog with a Blog - Gary
 2015: Happyish - JJ Keebler
 2013: Anger Management - Little Elvis
 2013: Child of the 70's - Bridges
 2012: Criminal Minds - Mr. Conrad
 2012: Breakout Kings - Kurt Peebles
 2012: Are You There, Chelsea? - Todd, The bartender
 2011: A.N.T. Farm - Officer 39
 2011: Modern Family - Bobby, "Our Children, Ourselves"
 2010: The Whole Truth - Judge Roland Tomassy
 2010: Boardwalk Empire - Kevin Kiley
 2010: 'Til Death -  Luther (2 episodes)
 2010: Cold Case - Nathaniel 'Biggie' Jones '71
 2009: It's Always Sunny in Philadelphia - Tiny (2 episodes)
 2008: Pushing Daisies - Simon
 2003: Charmed - Seamus Fitzpatrick
 2003: The Parkers - Frank Osgood
 2002: The Hughleys - Norman

Awards
2005 Best Actor - Fantasy at the ShockerFest International Film Festival

References

External links

Actors with dwarfism
American male film actors
American male stage actors
American male television actors
Living people
1971 births
Male actors from Ohio
American people of Italian descent
People from Elyria, Ohio